Meteo is a 1989 Hungarian science-fiction art film directed by András Mész. Underground tunnel scenes were shot in the Kőbánya cellar system, Budapest. and the factory scenes were shot in the Kőbánya brewery (now part of the Dreher Breweries). The film quickly gained cult status in Hungary after its release.

Cast 
 Judit László - Miss Piggy
 Péter Geltz - Wolf
 Károly Eperjes - Berlioz
 László Kistamás - Eckerman
 Zoltán Szilágyi Varga - Verõ
 János Derzsi - Fugitive Man
 Dorottya Horváth - Waitress
 Denisa Dér - Refugee girl
 Fajer Khaled 	- Arab Girl
 Szabolcs Szilágyi - Gangster Boss
 András Novák - Gangster Boss
 Béla Unger - Bodyguard
 János Csányi - Bodyguard
 Tibor Gazdag - Bodyguard
 Géza Balkay - Police Superintendent

Festivals 

The film was presented at the following festival:

 9 February 1990: Berlin International Film Festival, Germany
 1990: Budapest Hungarian Film Festival
 1990: Setúbal FESTROIA International Film Festival

Awards 

The film won the following awards:

 Best film, 1991 FilmFestival Cottbus
 Award of the Brandenburg Minister of Culture, 1991 FilmFestival Cottbus
 Best Performance Award for László Zsótér, 1990 Budapest Hungarian Film Festival, Budapest
 Award for Students of the College of Theater and Film Arts for Cinematographer Gábor Szabó, 1990 Budapest Hungarian Film Festival, Budapest
 FIPRESCI award, 1990 Setúbal FESTROIA International Film Festival

References